Wolfgang Hottenrott (born 13 June 1940) is a competition rower and Olympic champion for West Germany.

He was born in Hanover.

Hottenrott received a bronze medal in coxless pair at the 1964 Summer Olympics in Tokyo. He won a gold medal in coxed eight at the 1968 Summer Olympics in Mexico City, as a member of the rowing team from West Germany.

At the 1972 Games, he finished fifth with the West Germany boat in the eight event.

References

1940 births
Living people
West German male rowers
Olympic rowers of West Germany
Olympic rowers of the United Team of Germany
Rowers at the 1964 Summer Olympics
Rowers at the 1968 Summer Olympics
Rowers at the 1972 Summer Olympics
Olympic gold medalists for West Germany
Olympic bronze medalists for the United Team of Germany
Sportspeople from Hanover
Olympic medalists in rowing
Medalists at the 1968 Summer Olympics
Medalists at the 1964 Summer Olympics
European Rowing Championships medalists
20th-century German people